The National Newspaper Association (NNA) is a Pensacola, FL based non-profit newspaper trade association founded in 1885. The organization has over 2,300 members, making it the largest newspaper trade association in the United States. The organization has two major offices, one in Columbia, Missouri, and the other in Falls Church, Virginia.

History
The National Newspaper Association was founded by Benjamin Briggs Herbert on February 19, 1885, as the National Editorial Association (NEA) in New Orleans, Louisiana. The NEA's constitution was ratified after a meeting in 1886 and Benjamin Briggs Herbert was elected president of the organization. In 1891, Edwin William Stephens became the sixth president of National Editorial Association after a discussion at the organization's seventh annual convention. The National Editorial Association changed its name to the National Newspaper Association after a Dallas, Texas meeting in 1964.

Conventions
Since the organization's founding, the National Newspaper Association has held an annual news convention. At the conventions, newspaper editors meet and discuss various publishing related topics. An informal convention had taken place in New Orleans after the organization's founding. The organization's first formal convention took place on February 23, 1886 in Cincinnati, Ohio.

References

Further reading

External links
 

Newspaper associations
Organizations based in Columbia, Missouri
Organizations established in 1885